Sylvia and Michael is 1919 novel by the British writer Compton Mackenzie, sometimes known by the longer name The Later Adventures of Sylvia Scarlett. It was published as a sequel to the 1918 work Sylvia Scarlett, and portrays the heroine's adventures in a number of European cities including Paris, Kiev and Bucharest.

References

Bibliography

 Orel, Harold. Popular Fiction in England, 1914-1918. University Press of Kentucky, 1992.

1919 British novels
Novels by Compton Mackenzie